The following is a list of squads for each nation competing at the 2012 European Women's Handball Championship in Serbia.

On 5 November 2012, the official squad lists were announced and published. Of those 28-player squads, 16 were named for the final tournament.

On 4 December 2012, the official rosters were announced and published.

Caps and goals correct as of 4 December 2012.

Group A

Head coach: Jan Bašný

Head coach: Thorir Hergeirsson

Head coach: Saša Bošković

Head coach: Leonid Ratner

Group B

Head coach: Jan Pytlick

Head coach: Olivier Krumbholz

Head coach: Gino Strezovski

Head coach: Torbjörn Klingvall

Group C

Head coach: Vladimir Canjuga

Head coach: Heine Jensen

Head coach: Karl Erik Bøhn

Head coach: Jorge Dueñas

Group D

Head coach: Águst Þór Jóhannsson

Head coach: Dragan Adžić

Head coach: Gheorghe Tadici

Head coach: Vitaly Krokhin

References

External links
Official Website

2012 European Women's Handball Championship
European Handball Championship squads